The 1921 Chattanooga Moccasins football team represented the University of Chattanooga (now known as the University of Tennessee at Chattanooga) as a member of the Southern Intercollegiate Athletic Association during the 1921 college football season. In their third season under head coach Silas Williams, the Moccasins completed its 10-game schedule with a record of 4 wins and 6 losses.

Schedule

References

Chattanooga
Chattanooga Mocs football seasons
Chattanooga Moccasins football